Charles du Maine (1414–1472) was a French prince of blood and an advisor to Charles VII of France, his brother-in-law, during the Hundred Years' War. He was the third son of Louis II, Duke of Anjou and King of Naples, and Yolande of Aragon.

In 1434, he married Cobella Ruffo (d. 1442), Countess of Montalto and Corigliano. They had one son, named Jean Louis Marin, who died as an infant.

In 1437, he took up arms on behalf of King Charles VII of France, participating in the capture of Montereau, and that of Pontoise, in 1441. At this time, his brother, René of Anjou, ceded to him the County of Maine. He continued to take part in King Charles' campaigns.

By his second marriage, in 1443, to Isabelle of Luxembourg (d. 1472), daughter of Peter I of Luxembourg, Count of Saint-Pol, he had two children:
 Louise of Anjou (1445–1477, Carlat), married in 1462 at Poitiers, Jacques d'Armagnac, Duke of Nemours (d. 1477).
 Charles IV, Duke of Anjou (1446–1481)

A dispute over the county of Guise between Charles and Isabelle's brother, Louis of Luxembourg, Count of Saint-Pol, was settled by settling it upon Isabelle as a dowry.

Charles also had an illegitimate daughter, Mary of Anjou, who married Thomas Courtenay, 6th Earl of Devon.

He led the rearguard for King Louis XI of France at the Battle of Montlhéry in 1465.

Notes

References
 

 

Charles du Maine
Charles du Maine
Valois, Charles of
Valois, Charles of
Valois, Charles of
Valois, Charles of
House of Valois-Anjou
15th-century peers of France
Sons of kings